Jacques Henrard (born 23 July 1951) is a Belgian former freestyle and medley swimmer. He competed in two events at the 1968 Summer Olympics.

References

External links
 

1951 births
Living people
Belgian male freestyle swimmers
Olympic swimmers of Belgium
Swimmers at the 1968 Summer Olympics
People from Péruwelz
Sportspeople from Hainaut (province)